Vladimír Syrovátka (19 June 1908, Zdolbuniv – 14 September 1973, Prague) was a Czechoslovakian flatwater canoeist who competed in the 1930s. With Jan Brzák-Felix, he won a gold medal at the 1936 Summer Olympics in the C-2 1000 m event.

References
DatabaseOlympics.com profile
Sports-reference.com profile

1908 births
1973 deaths
People from Zdolbuniv
Canoeists at the 1936 Summer Olympics
Olympic canoeists of Czechoslovakia
Olympic gold medalists for Czechoslovakia
Olympic medalists in canoeing
Czechoslovak male canoeists
Medalists at the 1936 Summer Olympics